Largie Ramazani (born 27 February 2001) is a Belgian professional footballer who plays for Spanish club Almería. A winger capable of playing in both flanks, he can also play as a forward.

Club career

Early career
Born in Sint-Agatha-Berchem, Brussels, Ramazani moved to London at the age of 12, and joined Charlton Athletic's youth setup after failed trials at Fulham and Chelsea. On 3 July 2017, aged 16, he signed a four-year deal with Manchester United.

Manchester United
After impressing with the under-18s, Ramazani signed his first professional contract on 21 March 2018. He then progressed through the club's youth setup, playing for the under-21 and under-23 squads.

Ramazani made his senior debut for United on 28 November 2019, coming on as a late substitute for James Garner in a 2–1 UEFA Europa League away loss against FC Astana. He was released from the club the following June, after reportedly having rejected a new deal.

Almería
On 24 August 2020, free agent Ramazani signed a five-year contract with Spanish Segunda División club UD Almería. On 14 August 2022, he scored his first La Liga goal for Almería after promotion, in a 2–1 defeat against Real Madrid.

International career
Ramazani is of Burundian descent, being available to play for Burundi and Belgium. He represented the latter at under-17, under-18 and under-19 levels.

Personal life
Ramazani has Burundian parents. His older brother Diamant is also a footballer. A right back, he notably represented Lokeren.

Career statistics

Club

Honours 
Almería

 Segunda División: 2021–22

References

External links

2001 births
Living people
People from Sint-Agatha-Berchem
Belgian footballers
Belgium youth international footballers
Belgian people of Burundian descent
Association football wingers
R.S.C. Anderlecht players
Charlton Athletic F.C. players
Manchester United F.C. players
Segunda División players
UD Almería players
Belgian expatriate footballers
Belgian expatriate sportspeople in England
Belgian expatriate sportspeople in Spain
Expatriate footballers in England
Expatriate footballers in Spain
Footballers from Brussels